The Brezhnev Doctrine was a Soviet foreign policy that proclaimed any threat to socialist rule in any state of the Soviet Bloc in Central and Eastern Europe was a threat to them all, and therefore justified the intervention of fellow socialist states. It was proclaimed in order to justify the Soviet-led occupation of Czechoslovakia earlier in 1968, with the overthrow of the reformist government there. The references to "socialism" meant control by the communist parties loyal to the Kremlin. Soviet leader Mikhail Gorbachev repudiated the doctrine in the late 1980s, as the Kremlin accepted the peaceful overthrow of communist rule in all its satellite countries in Eastern Europe.

The policy was first and most clearly outlined by Sergei Kovalev in a September 26, 1968 Pravda article entitled "Sovereignty and the International Obligations of Socialist Countries". Leonid Brezhnev reiterated it in a speech at the Fifth Congress of the Polish United Workers' Party on November 13, 1968, which stated: "When forces that are hostile to socialism try to turn the development of some socialist country towards capitalism, it becomes not only a problem of the country concerned, but a common problem and concern of all socialist countries."

This doctrine was announced to retroactively justify the invasion of Czechoslovakia in August 1968 that ended the Prague Spring, along with earlier Soviet military interventions, such as the invasion of Hungary in 1956. These interventions were meant to put an end to liberalization efforts and uprisings that had the potential to compromise Soviet hegemony inside the Soviet Bloc, which was considered by the Soviet Union to be an essential and defensive and strategic buffer in case hostilities with NATO were to break out.

In practice, the policy meant that only limited independence of the satellite states' communist parties was allowed and that none would be allowed to compromise the cohesiveness of the Eastern Bloc in any way. That is, no country could leave the Warsaw Pact or disturb a ruling communist party's monopoly on power. Implicit in this doctrine was that the leadership of the Soviet Union reserved, for itself, the power to define "socialism" and "capitalism". Following the announcement of the Brezhnev Doctrine, numerous treaties were signed between the Soviet Union and its satellite states to reassert these points and to further ensure inter-state cooperation. The principles of the doctrine were so broad that the Soviets even used it to justify their military intervention in the communist (but non-Warsaw Pact) nation of Afghanistan in 1979. The Brezhnev Doctrine stayed in effect until it was ended with the Soviet reaction to the Polish crisis of 1980–1981.

Mikhail Gorbachev refused to use military force when Poland held free elections in 1989 and Solidarity defeated the Polish United Workers' Party. It was superseded by the facetiously named Sinatra Doctrine in 1989, alluding to the Frank Sinatra song "My Way". The refusal to intervene in the emancipation of the Eastern European satellite states and the Pan-European Picnic then led to the fall of the Iron Curtain and the largely peaceful collapse of the Eastern Bloc.

Origins

1956 Hungarian crisis
The period between 1953 and 1968 was saturated with dissidence and reformation within the Soviet satellite states. 1953 saw the death of Soviet Leader Joseph Stalin, followed closely by Nikita Khrushchev's 1956 "Secret Speech" denouncing Stalin. This denouncement of the former leader led to a period of the Soviet Era known commonly as "De-Stalinization." Under the blanket reforms of this process, Imre Nagy came to power in Hungary as the new Prime Minister, taking over for Mátyás Rákosi. Almost immediately Nagy set out on a path of reform. Police power was reduced, collectivized farms were breaking apart, industry and food production shifted and religious tolerance was becoming more prominent. These reforms shocked the Hungarian Communist Party. Nagy was quickly overthrown by Rákosi in 1955, and stripped of his political livelihood. Shortly after this coup, Khrushchev signed the Belgrade Declaration which stated "separate paths to socialism were permissible within the Soviet Bloc." With hopes for serious reform just having been extinguished in Hungary, this declaration was not received well by the Hungarians. Tensions quickly mounted in Hungary with demonstrations and calls for not only the withdrawal of Soviet troops, but for a Hungarian withdrawal from the Warsaw Pact as well. By October 23 Soviet forces landed in Budapest. A chaotic and bloody squashing of revolutionary forces lasted from October 24 until November 7. Although order was restored, tensions remained on both sides of the conflict. Hungarians resented the end of the reformation, and the Soviets wanted to avoid a similar crisis from occurring again anywhere in the socialist camp.

A peaceful Brezhnev Doctrine
When the Hungarian Revolution of 1956 ended, the Soviets adopted the mindset that governments supporting both Communism and capitalism must coexist, and more importantly, build relations. The Communist Party of the Soviet Union called for a peaceful coexistence, where the war between the United States and Soviet Union would come to a close. This ideal, further stressed that all people are equal, and own the right to solve the problems of their own countries themselves. The idea was that in order for both states to peacefully coexist, neither country can exercise the right to get involved in each other's internal affairs. The Soviets did not want the Americans getting into their business, as the Americans did not want the Soviets in theirs. While this idea was brought up following the events of Hungary, they were not put into effect for a great deal of time. This is further explained in the Renunciation section.

1968 Prague Spring
Notions of reform had been slowly growing in Czechoslovakia since the early-mid 1960s. However, once the Stalinist President Antonín Novotný resigned as head of the Czechoslovak Communist Party in January 1968, the Prague Spring began to take shape. Alexander Dubček replaced Novotný as head of the party, initially thought a friend to the Soviet Union. It was not long before Dubček began making serious liberal reforms. In an effort to establish what Dubček called "developed socialism", he instituted changes in Czechoslovakia to create a much more free and liberal version of the socialist state. Aspects of a market economy were implemented, travel abroad became easier for citizens, state censorship loosened, the power of the secret police was limited, and steps were taken to improve relations with the west. As the reforms piled up, the Kremlin quickly grew uneasy as they hoped to not only preserve socialism within Czechoslovakia, but to avoid another Hungarian-style crisis as well. Soviet panic compounded in March of ’68 when student protests erupted in Poland and Antonín Novotný resigned as the Czechoslovak President. March 21 Yuri Andropov, the KGB Chairman, issued a grave statement concerning the reforms taking place under Dubček. "The methods and forms by which the work is progressing in Czechoslovakia remind one very much of Hungary. In this outward appearance of chaos…there is a certain order. It all began like this in Hungary also, but then came the first and second echelons, and then, finally the social democrats."

Leonid Brezhnev sought clarification from Dubček on March 21, with the Politburo convened, on the situation in Czechoslovakia. Eager to avoid a similar fate as Imre Nagy, Dubček reassured Brezhnev that the reforms were totally under control and not on a similar path to those seen in 1956 in Hungary. Despite Dubček's assurances, other socialist allies grew uneasy by the reforms taking place in an Eastern European neighbor. Namely, the Ukrainians were very alarmed by the Czechoslovak deviation from standard socialism. The First Secretary of the Ukrainian Communist Party called on Moscow for an immediate invasion of Czechoslovakia in order to stop Dubček's "socialism with a human face" from spreading into Ukraine and sparking unrest. By May 6 Brezhnev condemned Dubček's system, declaring it a step toward "the complete collapse of the Warsaw Pact." After three months of negotiations, agreements, and rising tensions between Moscow and Czechoslovakia, the Soviet/Warsaw Pact invasion began on the night of August 20, 1968, which was to be met with great Czechoslovak discontent and resistance for many months into 1970.

Formation of the Doctrine
Brezhnev realized the need for a shift from Nikita Khrushchev's idea of "different paths to socialism" towards one that fostered a more unified vision throughout the socialist camp. "Economic integration, political consolidation, a return to ideological orthodoxy, and inter-Party cooperation became the new watchwords of Soviet bloc relations." On November 12, 1968, Brezhnev stated that "[w]hen external and internal forces hostile to socialism try to turn the development of a given socialist country in the direction of … the capitalist system ... this is no longer merely a problem for that country's people, but a common problem, the concern of all socialist countries." Brezhnev's statement at the Fifth Congress of the Polish United Workers Party effectively classified the issue of sovereignty as less important than the preservation of international socialism. While no new doctrine had been officially announced, it was clear that Soviet intervention was imminent if Moscow perceived any country to be at risk of jeopardizing the integrity of socialism.

Brezhnev Doctrine in practice
The vague, broad nature of the Brezhnev Doctrine allowed application to any international situation the USSR saw fit. This is clearly evident not only through the Prague Spring in 1968, and the indirect pressure on Poland from 1980 to 1981, but also in the Soviet involvement in Afghanistan starting in the 1970s. Any instance which caused the USSR to question whether or not a country was becoming a risk to international socialism, the use of military intervention was, in Soviet eyes, not only justified, but necessary.

Afghanistan 1979
The Soviet government's desire to link its foreign policy to the Brezhnev Doctrine was evoked again when it ordered a military intervention in Afghanistan in 1979. This was perhaps the last chapter of this doctrine's saga.

In April 1978, a coup in Kabul brought the Afghan Communist Party to power with Nur Muhammad Taraki being installed as the second president of Afghanistan. The previous president, Mohammed Daoud Khan was killed during the coup. The Saur Revolution (as the coup was known) took Moscow by surprise, who preferred that the pro-Soviet Daoud Khan stay in power. The previous regime had maintained a pro-Soviet foreign policy as Daoud Khan was a Pashtun who rejected the Durand Line as the frontier with Pakistan. The Afghan Communist Party was divided into a murderous factional struggle between factions known as the Khalq and Parcham. The Parcham was the more moderate of the two factions, arguing that Afghanistan was not ready for socialism, requiring more gradual process while the ultra-Communist Khalq favored a more radical approach. The Khalq faction was victorious and the leader of the Pacham faction Babrak Karmal fled to Moscow in fear of his life, to take up the position as Afghan ambassador in Moscow.

Islamic fundamentalists took issue with the Communist party in power. As a result, a jihad was proclaimed against the Communist government. Brezhnev and other Soviet leaders believed that the United States was behind the jihad in Afghanistan, and the rebellion in Afghanistan was seen in Moscow not so much in the context of Afghan politics with an unpopular government pursuing policies that much of the population rejected as the collectivisation of agriculture, but rather in the context of the Cold War, being seen as the first stage of an alleged American plot to instigate a jihad in Soviet Central Asia where the majority of the population was Muslim. To assist the government, the Soviet Union drastically increased its military aid to Afghanistan while sending Soviet advisers to train the Afghan military.

Following a split in the Communist Party, the leader of the Khalq faction, Hafizullah Amin, overthrew President Nur Muhammad Taraki and had him murdered on 8 October 1979. Soviet diplomats in Kabul had a low opinion of Taraki's ability to handle the rebellion, and an even lower one of Amin, who was regarded as a fanatic, but incompetent leader who lost control of the situation. In the fall of 1979, the leaders who pressed the most strongly for an invasion of Afghanistan to replace the incompetent Amin with Karmal who was the man better able to handle the crisis were the Foreign Minister Andrei Gromyko; the Chairman of KGB, Yuri Andropov and the Defense Minister Marshal Dmitry Ustinov. What was envisioned in Moscow was merely a short intervention to stabilize the situation and allow the Communist government to stay in power. Brezhnev was indecisive, fearing that an occupation of Afghanistan might not be the short war that Gromyko, Ustinov and Andropov kept insisting it would be, but was fearful of the possibility of an Islamic fundamentalist regime being established that would expand to export radical Islam into Soviet Central Asia. As it was, the inability and unwillingness of much of the Afghan Army to fight led the Soviets to fight in Afghanistan for almost 10 years. Ironically, despite what was being feared in Moscow, the United States was not supporting the Islamic fundamentalist rebellion in Afghanistan, and only started to support the mujahideen ("warriors of Allah") with weapons after the Soviet invasion, concentrating foreign policy matters in the form of linkage towards preventing Soviet expansion.

During his talks with the Soviets during his time as Ambassador, Karmal coordinated with the Soviet government to replace Amin. It was this coordination that led to both Soviet soldiers and airborne units attacking the Amin-lead Afghanistan government. In light of this attack, Amin ended up dead. The Soviets took it upon themselves to place their ally, former-Ambassador Babrak Karmal as the new lead of the government in Afghanistan.

The Soviet Union, once again, fell back to the Brezhnev Doctrine for rationale, claiming that it was both morally and politically justified. It was also explained by the Soviets that they owed help to their friend and ally Babrak Karmal.

Renunciation
The long lasting struggle of the war in Afghanistan made the Soviets realize that their reach and influence was in fact limited. "[The war in Afghanistan] had shown that socialist internationalism and Soviet national interests were not always compatible."  Tensions between the USSR and Czechoslovakia since 1968, as well as Poland in 1980, proved the inefficiencies inherent in the Brezhnev Doctrine.  The Solidarity Crisis in Poland  was resolved without outside intervention, leaving the Brezhnev doctrine effectively dead. Although the Kremlin wanted to preserve socialism in its satellites, the decision was not to intervene. Gorbachev's Glasnost and Perestroika finally opened the door for Soviet Bloc countries and republics to make reforms without fear of Soviet intervention. When East Germany desperately asked for Soviet troops to put down growing unrest in 1989, Gorbachev flatly refused.

Post-Brezhnev Doctrine
With the agreement to terminate the Brezhnev Doctrine, later came on a new leader for the Soviets—Mikhail Gorbachev. His were much more relaxed. This is most likely due to the fact that Brezhnev Doctrine was no longer at the disposal of the Soviet Union. This had a major effect on the way that the Soviets carried out their new mentality when dealing with countries they once tried to control. This was best captured by Gorbachev's involvement with a group by the name of the Council of Mutual Economic Assistance (CMEA). This organization lessens the control that the Soviets had on all other partners of the agreement. This notion provided other countries that were once oppressed under communist intervention, to go about their own political reform. This actually carried over internally as well. In fact, the Soviet Union's biggest problem after the removal of the Brezhnev Doctrine, was the Khrushchev Dilemma. This did not address how to stop internal political reform, but how to tame the physical violence that comes along with it. It had become clear that the Soviet Union was beginning to loosen up.

It is possible to pinpoint the renouncement of the Brezhnev Doctrine as to what started the end for the Soviet Union. Countries that were once micromanaged now could do what they wanted to politically, because the Soviets could no longer try to conquer where they saw fit. With that, the Soviet Union began to collapse. While the communist agenda had caused infinite problems for other countries, it was the driving force behind the Soviet Union staying together. After all, it seems that the removal of the incentive to conquer, and forcing of communism upon other nations, defeated the one thing Soviet Russia had always been about, the expansion of Communism.

With the fall of the Brezhnev Doctrine, came the fall of the man, Brezhnev himself, the share of power in the Warsaw Pact, and perhaps the final moment for the Soviet Union, the Berlin Wall. The Brezhnev Doctrine coming to a close, was perhaps the beginning of the end for one of the strongest empires in the world's history, the Soviet Union.

In other Communist countries
The Soviet Union was not the only Communist country to intervene militarily in fellow countries. Vietnam deposed the Khmer Rouge in the Cambodian–Vietnamese War of 1978, which was followed by a revenge Chinese invasion of Vietnam in the Sino-Vietnamese War of 1979.

Criticisms

Brezhnev Doctrine as a UN violation
This doctrine was even furthermore a problem in the view of the United Nations. The UN's first problem was that it permits use of force. This is a clear violation of Article 2, Chapter 4 of the United Nations Charter which states, "All members shall refrain in their international relations from the threat or use of force against the territorial integrity political independence of any state, or in any other manner inconsistent with the Purposes of the United Nations." When international law conflicts with the Charter, the Charter has precedent. It is this, that makes the Brezhnev Doctrine illegal.

See also
Captive Nations
Imperialism
Monroe Doctrine
Russian-occupied territories
Soviet Empire
Soviet occupations
Tankie
Ulbricht Doctrine
Western betrayal

References

Bibliography
 Freedman, Lawrence, and Jeffrey Michaels. "Soviet Doctrine from Brezhnev to Gorbachev." in The Evolution of Nuclear Strategy (Palgrave Macmillan, London, 2019) pp. 527–542.

.
Hunt, Lynn. The Making of the West: Peoples and Cultures (Bedford/St. Martin's, Boston and London. 2009).
 Jones, Robert A. The Soviet Concept of 'Limited Sovereignty' from Lenin to Gorbachev: The Brezhnev Doctrine (Springer, 2016).
 Kemp-Welch, Anthony. "Poland and the Brezhnev Doctrine (1968–1989)." Wolność i Solidarność 10 (2017): 155–223. online in English

 Kramer, Mark. "The Kremlin, the Prague Spring, and the Brezhnev Doctrine." in Promises of 1968 (2010) pp: 285–370. online
 Lesaffer, Randall. "Brezhnev Doctrine." in The Encyclopedia of Diplomacy (2018) pp: 1–5.
 Loth, Wilfried. "Moscow, Prague and Warsaw: Overcoming the Brezhnev Doctrine." Cold War History 1.2 (2001): 103–118.
 Mitchell, R. Judson. "The Brezhnev doctrine and communist ideology." The Review of Politics 34.2 (1972): 190–209. online
Ouimet, Matthew: The Rise and Fall of the Brezhnev Doctrine in Soviet Foreign Policy. University of North Carolina Press, Chapel Hill and London. 2003.
Pravda, September 25, 1968; translated by Novosti, Soviet press agency. Reprinted in L. S. Stavrianos, The Epic of Man (Englewood Cliffs, N.J.: Prentice Hall, 1971), pp. 465–466.

 Valenta, Jiri. "Soviet Decisionmaking on Afghanistan, 1979." im Soviet Decisionmaking for National Security (Routledge, 2021) pp. 218–236.

External links
 

1968 in international relations
1968 in the Soviet Union
Czechoslovakia–Soviet Union relations
Eastern Bloc
Foreign policy doctrines
Foreign relations of the Soviet Union
Leonid Brezhnev
Neo-Stalinism
Prague Spring